Mazgirt District is a district of Tunceli Province in Turkey. The town of Mazgirt is the seat and the district had a population of 7,357 in 2021. The kaymakam is Menderes Topçuoĝlu.

Composition 
Beside the town of Mazgirt, the district encompasses the municipality of Akpazar, sixty-eight villages and ninety-eight hamlets.

Villages 

 Ağaçardı
 Akdüven
 Akkavak
 Aktarla
 Akyünlü
 Alanyazı
 Alhan
 Anıtçınar
 Aslanyurdu
 Aşağıoyumca
 Aşağıtarlacık
 Ataçınarı
 Avunca
 Aydınlık
 Ayvatlı
 Balkan
 Beşoluk
 Beylermezraası
 Bulgurcular
 Çatköy
 Dallıbel
 Danaburan
 Darıkent
 Dayılar
 Dazkaya
 Demirci
 Demirkazık
 Doğanlı
 Doğucak
 Geçitveren
 Gelincik
 Gelinpınar
 Göktepe
 Güleç
 Gümüşgün
 İbimahmut
 İsmailli
 Kalaycı
 Kaleköy
 Karayusuf
 Karsan
 Karşıkonak
 Kartutan
 Kavaktepe
 Kayacı
 Kızılcık
 Kızılkale
 Koçkuyusu
 Koyunuşağı
 Kuşaklı
 Kuşhane
 Obrukkaşı
 Obuzbaşı
 Ortadurak
 Ortaharman
 Otlukaya
 Oymadal
 Öreniçi
 Özdek
 Sarıkoç
 Sökücek
 Sülüntaş
 Temürtaht
 Yaşaroğlu
 Yazeli
 Yeldeğen
 Yenibudak
 Yukarıoyumca

References 

Districts of Tunceli Province
Mazgirt District